The 1958 Notre Dame Fighting Irish football team represented the University of Notre Dame during the 1958 NCAA University Division football season.

Schedule

Personnel

Game summaries

Indiana

References

Notre Dame
Notre Dame Fighting Irish football seasons
Notre Dame Fighting Irish football